Gareyka (Gäräy) is a rural locality (a village) in Nizhnesikiyazovsky Selsoviet, Baltachevsky District, Bashkortostan, Russia. The population was 39 as of 2010. There is 1 street.

Geography 
Gareyka is located 19 km north of Starobaltachevo (the district's administrative centre) by road. Starokalmiyarovo is the nearest rural locality.

References 

Rural localities in Baltachevsky District